Vehicle Factory Jabalpur (Hindi: वाहन निर्माणी जबलपुर), is a military motor vehicle factory, located in Jabalpur, Madhya Pradesh, India, part of Armoured Vehicles Nigam Limited which was previously a part  of Ordnance Factory Board, controlled by the Ministry of Defence, Government of India.

History
The production of Shaktiman trucks (MAN 415 L1 AR), Jonga (Jabalpur Ordnance and Guncarriage Assembly) Light Utility Vehicles and the Vahan 1 ton (Nissan 4W73 Carrier), began at the Gun Carriage Factory Jabalpur, in 1959. Pandit Jawaharlal Nehru, the then Prime Minister of India, was present to witness rolling out of the first batch of vehicles at GCF. It was shifted to the present location in 1969.
It started manufacturing Shaktiman trucks with license from MAN SE of Germany,  along with Jonga and Vahan 1 ton under license from Nissan of Japan.
All three of the above products have been retired and replaced by the new products.

Products
VFJ manufactures and assembles general staff vehicles, logistics vehicles, light armoured vehicles like bullet-proof vehicles, mine protected vehicles and specialist role vehicles such as rocket launchers, self-propelled howitzers, water bowsers, fuel tankers, field ambulances, tippers, battery command posts, generator sets, light recovery vehicles, field artillery tractors, kitchen containers etc. It also has some variants for civilian applications.

 Rocket launchers for Pinaka and Smerch with OFAJ
 5/7.5 Ton Stallion Mk-IV BS-III
 2.5 Ton LPTA 715 BS-III 
 Water Bowser 2 KL on LPTA
 Water Bowser 5 KL on Stallion
 Kitchen Container on Stallion
 Field Ambulance on LPTA 
 Light Recovery Vehicle (LRV)
 Field Artillery Tractor (FAT)
 Yuktirath – Light Armoured Recovery Vehicle

 Truck-mounted AK-630 CIWS with OFMK 
 5 KL Fuel Tanker on Stallion 
 2 KL Fuel Tanker on LPTA
 Battery Command Post (BCP)
 Mobile AC Generators
 Operation Theatre on wheels
 Mobile Decontamination Unit
 Tipper on Stallion
 Tipper on LPTA
 Aditya – India's first Mine Protected Vehicle

 Self-propelled Dhanush and Sharang guns and their tractors with GCF
 Matang
 Trishul
 Flyer ITV
 Caravan
 Drill Rig
 Humsafar Buses (Long & Medium)
 Fire fighting variants of Stallion and LPTA
 Bullet-proofing of 407, LPTA, Gypsy, Ambassador

Gallery

Technology 
VFJ has an R&D centre responsible for development of future vehicles and related technologies. It has tie-ups with Ashok Leyland and Tata Motors. Its research partner is Vehicle Research & Development Establishment of Defence Research and Development Organisation.

Customers 
Since VFJ produces defence vehicles, its primary customers are the Indian Armed Forces, Central Armed Police Forces, State Armed Police Forces, Paramilitary Forces of India and Special Forces of India, which have land-based operations. It also supplies vehicles to civilians, government and private organisations.

References

Bus manufacturers of India
Car manufacturers of India
Defence companies of India
Military vehicle manufacturers
Truck manufacturers of India
Companies based in Kolkata
Vehicle manufacturing companies established in 1969
Ministry of Defence (India)
Motor vehicle assembly plants in India
Buildings and structures in Jabalpur
Indian companies established in 1969
1969 establishments in West Bengal